Telescopus rhinopoma is a species of rear-fanged mildly venomous snake (not harmful for humans) in the family Colubridae. The species is found in the Middle East (Iran), Afghanistan, Pakistan desert areas like Bahawalpur, and Central Asia (Turkmenistan).

Common names
Common names for T. rhinopoma include Indian Desert Cat snake,  Desert cat snake.

Geographic range
Telescopus rhinopoma is found in southern Iran, southern Turkmenistan, southwestern Afghanistan, and western and northwestern Pakistan. Recorded form Bahawalpur desert areas.

Description
It's known as Desert Cat Snake because it is found in the desert area and its eyes are like cat's eyes. This snake is found in desert areas of Middle East (Iran), Afghanistan, Pakistan like Bahawalpur Desert areas and Turkmenistan. It is a mild venomous snake which cannot cause death to human beings. It is gray in color with dark brown spots. Its stomach is dark brown. Its diet includes desert lizards and rats. Telescopus rhinopoma may attain a total length (including tail) of about one meter (39 inches).

Reproduction
Telescopus rhinopoma is oviparous.

References

Further reading
Blanford WT (1874). "Descriptions of New Reptilia and Amphibia from Persia and Baluchistán". Ann. Mag. Nat. Hist., Fourth Series 14: 31–35. (Dipsas rhinopoma, new species, p. 34). (in English and Latin).
Böhme W (1977). "Further Specimens of the Rare Cat Snake, Telescopus rhinopoma (Blanford, 1874) (Reptilia, Serpentes, Colubridae)". Journal of Herpetology 11 (2): 201–205.
Boulenger GA (1895). "An Addition to the Ophidian Fauna of India (Tarbophis rhinopoma, Blanf.)". J. Bombay Nat. Hist. Soc. 9: 325. (Tarbophis rhinopoma, new combination).
Boulenger GA (1896). Catalogue of the Snakes in the British Museum (Natural History). Volume III., Containing the Colubridæ (Opisthoglyphæ and Proteroglyphæ) ... London: Trustees of the British Museum (Natural History). (Taylor and Francis, printers). xiv + 727 pp. + Plates I-XXV. (Tarbophis rhinopoma, p. 50).
Latifi, Mahmoud (1991). The Snakes of Iran. Oxford, Ohio: Society for the Study of Amphibians and Reptiles. 156 pp. . ("Telescopus rhinopoma, Leopard Viper", p. 120).
Smith MA (1943). The Fauna of British India, Ceylon and Burma, Containing the Whole of the Indo-Chinese Sub-region. Reptilia and Amphibia. Vol. III.—Serpentes. London: Secretary of State for India. (Taylor and Francis, printers). xii + 583 pp. (Tarbophis rhinopoma, pp. 360–361, Figure 113, drawing of maxilla).

Telescopus
Reptiles of the Middle East
Reptiles of Afghanistan
Reptiles of Iran
Reptiles of Pakistan
Reptiles of Central Asia
Taxa named by William Thomas Blanford
Reptiles described in 1874